Angel Baby is a 1961 American drama film directed by Paul Wendkos and starring Salome Jens, George Hamilton and Mercedes McCambridge. It was Burt Reynolds' film debut.

Wendkos called it "one of my favorite pictures,  because I had a theme."

The song "Jenny Angel," sung by George Hamilton, is played during the closing credits of the film.

Plot
In the rural American south, Angel Baby, who has been mute from age eight on, is caught kissing Hoke by her mother, who interrupts them and chases Hoke off. Worried about Angel's soul, they go to a tent revival where Paul is preaching. Paul heals her muteness, urging her on to say "God" at first, then "Lord God" and a prayer of thankfulness.

The next day, Angel believes that God has called her, so she decides to follow Paul and work in his ministry. She is given speaking lessons and a great deal of attention. Paul's wife, Sarah, is a bit jealous. Paul's preaching method includes having provocatively costumed women perform the parts of temptresses in the bible, such as Jezebel and Delilah.

Increasingly attracted to Paul, Angel's devotion and passion is cemented when she is rescued by Paul after being attacked by Hoke for rejecting him due to her newfound piety. However, Paul's wife and several other people see the end of the fight and misunderstand Paul's intentions, though it turns out that Paul is in fact in love with Angel.

Angel sets off on her own traveling ministry (with the help of Ben and Molly Hays), but she isn't attracting many followers or many donations.

Noticing her beauty and potential, an unscrupulous businessman, Sam Wilcox, approaches Angel Baby to market his patent medicines. To restore her faith, he hires a few shills in the audience to be healed, despite the warnings of Angel's support team. When they see that the trick has empowered her, they remain silent. They "have a little nip" and head over to Paul and Sarah's to reveal this falsehood.

Paul remains dissatisfied with his marriage to Sarah, because it turns out he was but a choirboy who was led astray by her, molded into a prophet of her imagination. His faith at a low point, he leaves Sarah, ostensibly to go set Angel back on the right path.

Angel has become more and more popular, drawing huge crowds, including Hoke, who vows that he will not stand in line to see her. He and his friends spy Paul approaching the revival tent.

At the front of the tent, there are so many people trying to get in, they are assigned numbers. One man (with a lame leg and 13 children) is particularly bitter about this, yet manages to get in.

Paul tells Angel he wants to marry her (and will be divorcing Sarah). This invigorates Angel's preaching. Meanwhile, Paul confronts Sam who is drinking heavily in the parking lot, telling him he must confess.

Things are going well in the tent, until Sarah bursts in, shouts condemnation of Angel and claims the man in the wheelchair has been paid to fake a miracle. Hoke joins in the fray. The man in the wheelchair freaks out and leaves, which clearly demonstrates the falsehood, and a large fight ensues. As people flee, there is a particularly vivid shot of an upturned wheelchair wheel spinning as the crowd in the background runs around. The tent stars to fall. Sam tries to confess during the middle of the melee, but no one is really listening. Eventually the tent sinks down.

Hoke approaches Angel, who has become mute again. She continues past him as if she can't see or hear him.

Paul emerges from the tent, after removing a large timber that has fallen on his wife.

Angel winds up at a small store, where a husband and wife recognize her and want her to heal their lame son. She turns out not to be mute after all; she tells them that she cannot heal the child. Paul shows up about the same time, and watches as she performs a final miracle; while her faith in herself is destroyed, other people still believe.

The song playing during the closing credits is sung by George Hamilton.

Cast
 George Hamilton as Paul Strand
 Mercedes McCambridge as Sarah Strand
 Salome Jens as "Angel Baby"
 Burt Reynolds as "Hoke" Adams
 Joan Blondell as Mollie Hays
 Henry Jones as Ben Hays
 Roger Clark as Sam Wilcox

Production
After appearing in Where the Boys Are, George Hamilton was determined to make "better, more serious movies," in part to impress the family of his girlfriend Susan Kohner.

Filming began in April 1960 under the direction of Hubert Cornfield. Shortly into filming in Coral Gables, Florida, Cornfield fell ill with appendicitis and Paul Wendkos replaced him. According to Wendkos, only "about two seconds" of footage shot by Cornfield remained in the final film.

Wendkos later said: "I came down and found the company in utter chaos. Everybody was thoroughly demoralized, and I had to come in and  pick up all the loose pieces, and performed an act of therapy more or less. I had a very strong approach to the material which made it all very  simple, but allowed everyone to get a common grasp on the material. The concept of course was the corruption of innocence, at the core and very fundamental to the picture, and everybody immediately sparked to that theme, that concept, and it gave them strength that immediately resurrected the whole project."

Burt Reynolds later stated: "George Hamilton beat me up in the film. Does that tell you anything?"

See also
 List of American films of 1961

References

External links
 
 

1961 films
Films directed by Paul Wendkos
1961 drama films
American drama films
1960s English-language films
1960s American films
Films about disability